Pangio is a genus of small Asian freshwater fish in the true loach family Cobitidae. In earlier taxonomic schemes it was known as Acanthophthalmus. The "kuhli loach" is well-known in the aquarium trade and commonly identified as P. kuhlii, but most individuals actually appear to be P. semicincta.

The type species is Cobitis cinnamomea McClelland 1839, now known as Pangio pangia.

These fish are best represented in Southeast Asia where all but five of the species live, including the Greater Sunda Islands with sixteen species. The five species found outside Southeast Asia are from India and Myanmar. They inhabit a wide range of mostly calm waters such as streams, swamps (often peat swamps) and backwaters, but there are also species in fast-flowing waters, and one, P. bhujia, lives underground.

Species
 

There are currently 33 recognized species in this genus:

 Pangio agma (M. E. Burridge, 1992)
 Pangio alcoides Kottelat & K. K. P. Lim, 1993
 Pangio alternans Kottelat & K. K. P. Lim, 1993
 Pangio ammophila Britz, Anvar Ali & Raghavan, 2012
 Pangio anguillaris (Vaillant, 1902)
 Pangio apoda Britz & Maclaine, 2007
 Pangio atactos H. H. Tan & Kottelat, 2009
Pangio bhujia Anoop et al., 2019
Pangio pathala Sundar, Remya L; Arjun, C.P.; Sidharthan, Arya; Dahanukar, Neelesh; Raghavan, Rajeev
 Pangio bitaimac H. H. Tan & Kottelat, 2009
 Pangio cuneovirgata (Raut, 1957)
 Pangio doriae (Perugia, 1892)
 Pangio elongata Britz & Maclaine, 2007
 Pangio filinaris Kottelat & K. K. P. Lim, 1993
 Pangio fusca (Blyth, 1860)
 Pangio goaensis (Tilak, 1972) (Indian coolie-loach)
 Pangio incognito Kottelat & K. K. P. Lim, 1993
 Pangio kuhlii (Valenciennes, 1846) (Kuhli loach, coolie loach)
 Pangio lidi Hadiaty & Kottelat, 2009
 Pangio longimanus Britz & Kottelat, 2010
 Pangio lumbriciformis Britz & Maclaine, 2007
 Pangio malayana (Tweedie, 1956)
 Pangio mariarum (Inger & P. K. Chin, 1962)
 Pangio muraeniformis (de Beaufort, 1933)
 Pangio myersi (Harry, 1949)
 Pangio oblonga (Valenciennes, 1846) (Java loach)
 Pangio pangia (F. Hamilton, 1822)
 Pangio piperata Kottelat & K. K. P. Lim, 1993
 Pangio pulla Kottelat & K. K. P. Lim, 1993
 Pangio robiginosa (Raut, 1957)
 Pangio semicincta (Fraser-Brunner, 1940)
 Pangio shelfordii (Popta, 1903) (Borneo loach)
 Pangio signicauda Britz & Maclaine, 2007
 Pangio superba (T. R. Roberts, 1989)

References 

 
Cobitidae
Taxa named by Edward Blyth